The Grammy Award for Best Contemporary Christian Music Song is an honor presented at the Grammy Awards, a ceremony that was established in 1958 and originally called the Gramophone Awards, to recording artists for quality songs in the Contemporary Christian music (CCM) genre. Honors in several categories are presented at the ceremony annually by the National Academy of Recording Arts and Sciences of the United States to "honor artistic achievement, technical proficiency and overall excellence in the recording industry, without regard to album sales or chart position".

This award is a new category in the annual Grammy Awards ceremony from 2012. Previously, the Recording Academy did not make a distinction between Contemporary Christian Music (CCM) and Gospel music, but in its drastic overhaul of Grammy Awards categories from 2012, announced on April 6, 2011, it said that "it was determined that there are two distinct wings to the gospel house: Contemporary Christian Music (CCM) and Urban or Soul Gospel, and these two groups share in their overall mission". It continued: "Additionally, it was determined that the word "Gospel" tends to conjure up the images and sounds of traditional soul gospel and not CCM. With this in mind, it was decided not only to rename each of the categories, but also the entire [genre] field. [It] was determined that album and songwriting categories are of highest importance; Gospel and CCM each now have one category for each".

As a result, the Best Gospel Song category was split into a category for "old-style" gospel music (still named Best Gospel Song) and a category for Contemporary Christian Music.

From 2015, due to a restructuring of the Gospel/Contemporary Christian Music category field, this category will merge with the Best Gospel/Contemporary Christian Music Performance category to create the new Grammy Award for Best Contemporary Christian Music Performance/Song category, which will recognize both performers and songwriters of Contemporary Christian Music songs. According to the Grammy committee, "changes to the field were made in the interest of clarifying the criteria, representing the current culture and creative DNA of the gospel and Contemporary Christian Music communities, and better reflecting the diversity and authenticity of today's gospel music industry".

Recipients

 Each year is linked to the article about the Grammy Awards held that year.
 The performing artist is only listed but does not receive the award.
 Showing the name of the songwriter(s), the nominated song and in parentheses the performer's name(s).

See also
Grammy Award for Best Gospel/Contemporary Christian Music Performance
Grammy Award for Best Contemporary Christian Music Performance/Song
Grammy Award for Best Gospel Song
Grammy Award for Song of the Year
List of religion-related awards

References

General
  Note: User must select the "Gospel" category as the genre under the search feature.

Specific

External links
 Official site

Contemporary Christian Music Song
Christian music awards
Song awards
Songwriting awards